Karl Walter Anderson (November 5, 1900 – February 28, 1989) was an American track and field athlete who competed in the 1924 Summer Olympics. He was born in Minneapolis, Minnesota. In 1924 he finished fifth in the 110 metre hurdles competition at the Paris Games.

References

External links

1900 births
1989 deaths
American male hurdlers
Olympic track and field athletes of the United States
Athletes (track and field) at the 1924 Summer Olympics
South High School (Minnesota) alumni
20th-century American people